EuroBasket 2011 was the 37th men's European Basketball Championship, held by FIBA Europe. The competition was hosted by Lithuania. This was the second time EuroBasket had been held in Lithuania, the country having also hosted the 1939 championship. FIBA Europe asserted that Lithuania managed to organize the best European championship in its history. The top two teams are guaranteed spots at the 2012 Summer Olympics.

EuroBasket 2011 was the largest sporting event in the history of the Baltic states, both in terms of the number of national teams (24), games (90), and that of spectators (158,000 tickets sold, with most tickets valid for three separate games.)

Spain won the title for the second consecutive tournament, after defeating France, by a score of 98–85 in the final. Spain's Juan Carlos Navarro was the tournament's MVP.

Venues and attendances 

The group matches were played in four arenas, namely Alytus Arena, Šiauliai Arena, Cido Arena in Panevėžys and an arena in Klaipėda. The second stage matches were played at the Siemens Arena in the capital Vilnius and the playoffs at the new Žalgiris Arena in Kaunas.

All tickets were sold for matches in which Lithuania played in a matter of several hours after the start of sale. Other tickets were also sold out in advance for all venues except for Alytus (75% of available tickets sold in total). However the Organizing Committee's policy of selling tickets as a 3-game package meant that in some cases the sold-out arenas were not full as some fans would choose to go to only some of the games their ticket entitled them to. This policy was altered in Panevėžys where there were separate tickets for the games Lithuania played.

20,000 foreign visitors went to Lithuania for the championship. 135,000 local fans visited the arenas. 120,000 people (both local and foreign) watched EuroBasket 2011 matches in special fan zones that were constructed beside every arena with a large screen and outdoor seating available.

Among the foreign teams the Georgian, Slovenian, Russian and Latvian national teams had the most fans traveling from their home countries. Georgians had certain city squares decorated in their flags in both Klaipėda and Vilnius.

Several famous people and heads of states went to championship. This included the president of Georgia Mikheil Saakashvili, Foreign Minister of Russia Sergey Lavrov and prince of Spain Felipe.

Teams 

It was first decided that 16 teams would participate in EuroBasket 2011, however FIBA Europe decided on 5 September 2010, in a meeting in Istanbul, that there would be 24 teams in the tournament, after the Qualifying Round was concluded.

Lithuania automatically received a place as the hosts, nine other countries that competed in the 2010 FIBA World Championship also received a place, 12 Countries were determined through qualifying matches played in August 2010 (five had initially qualified, and seven were added after the decision to expand the tournament to 24 teams), and two more qualifiers were decided in an additional qualifying tournament that took place in August 2011. All but one of the 15 countries that participated in the Qualifying Round qualified for the final tournament.

Qualification

Qualified teams

Squads 

Each team consisted of 12 players. Only 1 among the 12 could be a naturalised foreign player, who could not have been in the national team of another nation. Some of the teams had players that traced their ancestry to the teams they represent and were allowed to play for that team, such as Germany (US-born Chris Kaman) and Israel (US-born David Blu, who as Jewish was entitled to Israeli citizenship from birth). Other teams naturalised players participating in their country's league system, among them Spain (Congolese-born Serge Ibaka), Croatia (US-born Dontaye Draper), Bulgaria (US-born E. J. Rowland), Belgium (US-born Marcus Faison), and Poland (US-born Thomas Kelati, who qualified for Polish citizenship through marriage to a Pole). Montenegro and Macedonia each naturalised US-born players who had never played in their league system, but had played in neighbouring Serbia, respectively Omar Cook and Bo McCalebb. Other naturalised players moved to their current countries in their youth, with a notable example being Great Britain's Luol Deng, who fled the Sudanese Civil War with his family as a child.

Lithuania, Serbia, Portugal (Cape Verde was a Portuguese colony) and Finland are notable exceptions, with all of their players having been born in Lithuania, Portugal, Serbia and Finland respectively. Another exception was Latvia playing without foreign players.
Turkey had Enes Kanter, who was born to Turkish parents in Switzerland as well as Emir Preldzic, who was born in Zenica, Bosnia and Herzegovina and had already played on the national team of Slovenia in the Olympic Qualifying Tournament in 2008 and Slovenian youth national teams.

Some of the Eastern European national teams, such as Bosnia and Herzegovina, were composed mainly or entirely from players playing abroad. This was primarily true for countries that have good basketball players but no powerful clubs or leagues to match that.

On the other hand, for countries with strong leagues, such as Italy, the National teams were primarily composed of players playing in the local league. The same was true for countries weak in basketball (i.e. with both weak national team and local league) as their players are unable to get into strong foreign leagues. Portugal could be an example here.

Many NBA players represented their national teams, with the Spanish team having 6 NBA stars, the French team having 5, the Turkish team having 4, and so on. It was one of the strongest European basketball competition ever organized as a lot of European stars helped their nations.

Notable players and coaches 

 Spain:
  Pau Gasol
  Marc Gasol
  Rudy Fernández
  Ricky Rubio
  Juan Carlos Navarro
  José Calderón
  Serge Ibaka
  Sergio Scariolo (coach)
 France:
  Tony Parker
  Joakim Noah
  Nicolas Batum
  Boris Diaw
  Mickaël Gelabale
  Nando de Colo
 Russia:
  Andrei Kirilenko
  Victor Khryapa
  Timofey Mozgov
  Andrey Vorontsevich
  Vitaly Fridzon
  Alexey Shved
  Sergei Monia
  David Blatt (coach)
 Macedonia:
  Bo McCalebb
  Vlado Ilievski
  Pero Antić

 Lithuania:
  Šarūnas Jasikevičius
  Jonas Valančiūnas
  Darius Songaila
  Rimantas Kaukėnas
  Kšyštof Lavrinovič
 Greece:
  Ioannis Bourousis
  Nikos Zisis
  Nick Calathes
  Kostas Papanikolaou
  Kosta Koufos
 Slovenia:
  Jaka Lakovič
  Goran Dragić
  Erazem Lorbek
  Mirza Begić
  Božidar Maljković (coach)
 Serbia:
  Miloš Teodosić
  Nemanja Bjelica
  Nenad Krstić
  Duško Savanović
  Dušan Ivković (coach)
 Germany:
  Dirk Nowitzki
  Chris Kaman
 Turkey:
  Ersan İlyasova
  Ömer Aşık
  Enes Kanter
  Hedo Türkoğlu

 Georgia:
  Zaza Pachulia
  Giorgi Shermadini
  Tornike Shengelia
 Croatia:
  Ante Tomić
  Marko Popović
  Bojan Bogdanović
  Dontaye Draper
 Great Britain:
  Luol Deng
  Joel Freeland
 Israeli:
  Omri Casspi
 Poland:
  Thomas Kelati
  Dardan Berisha
 Bosnia and Herzegovina
  Mirza Teletović
 Italy:
  Andrea Bargnani
  Marco Belinelli
  Danilo Gallinari
  Simone Pianigiani (coach)
 Montenegro:
  Omar Cook
  Nikola Peković
  Nikola Vučević
 Latvia:
  Dāvis Bertāns
  Dairis Bertāns
 Belgium:
  Tomas Van Den Spiegel
  D. J. Mbenga
 Portugal:
  Mário Palma (coach)

Group draw and championship system 

The draw ceremony held on 30 January 2011 in the Lithuanian National Drama Theatre, Vilnius, divided the qualified teams into four groups of six, groups A, B, C, and D. The hosts of the evening were Jurgita Jurkutė and Vytautas Rumšas. The balls were drawn by retired basketball players European champions and Olympic medalists Stasys Stonkus, Modestas Paulauskas, Dino Meneghin, Sergejus Jovaiša, Alexander Anatolyevich Volkov and Arvydas Sabonis. A special concert followed the draw where a song was dedicated for each of the participating nations.

It was decided that Group A games would take place in Panevėžys, Group B in Šiauliai, Group C in Alytus and Group D in Klaipėda.

In the first stage every team had to play against every other team of their group (round robin). This meant five matches per team.

From every group the 3 best teams advanced to the second stage and the 3 worst teams were eliminated. In the second stage 2 new groups were formed. The 3 best teams from groups A and B were united to form group E whereas the 3 best teams from groups C and D were united to form group F.

In these two new groups of the second stage only matches by teams that had not yet played each other had to be played. As for the matches that had already happened in the first stage their results would also count in the second stage. Therefore, every team played 3 matches and there were 12 teams in the second stage.

Out of the second stage the 4 best teams from each of the two groups advanced to the quarterfinals (8 teams in total) whereas the 2 worst teams were eliminated from championship (4 teams in total).

Logo, official song and mascot of the championship 

A public contest was introduced to create the logo for the competition. 49 designs were presented initially to the organizers and the best three were sent to FIBA Europe, which selected the winning design. The author of it was designer Kęstutis Koira. The EuroBasket 2011 logo was unveiled on 24 January 2009 in Cido Arena, Panevėžys, during the final game of the Lithuanian Basketball Federation Cup. It displays the Columns of Gediminas overlaid on a backboard.

Lithuania is the first host country of EuroBasket to have an official EuroBasket song. The song "Celebrate basketball", written by Marijonas Mikutavičius and performed by Mia, Mantas Jankavičius and Marijonas Mikutavičius, was chosen by a televoting in Lithuania. There are two versions of the song – in Lithuanian and English. Later, another version was added – "Nebetyli sirgaliai" (lit. The Fans are no Longer Quiet).

The mascot of the championship was Amberis. Its head was in the form and color of a piece of amber. The name "Amberis" is a portmanteau of the English word amber and the Lithuanian nominative case masculine gender ending "is". The real word for amber in Lithuanian is Gintaras. There was an Amberis in every arena and quite frequently there were more than a single Amberis at a time interacting with each other as well as spectators. On the screens in the arenas a "legend" was shown where a piece of amber was given by a coach to a young basketball player to bring him luck and this piece turned into Amberis.

Special events 

Basketball enjoys extraordinary popularity in Lithuania. As such, many events were organized to mark the championship, including:

 In summer 2011 a dribble marathon around the whole of Lithuania was organized. Groups of people would dribble from one town to the next one, where they would give the balls to another set of people who would then dribble to the next town and so on.  Every town of Lithuania was visited with TV documenting the events every day. Among the people who took part in the event were the president of Lithuania, several ministers, mayors, sportsmen, opera and ballet stars and so on. In the end the 13 balls were given to the Lithuanian National Basketball team on 29 August 2011.
 On 29 August 2011, Lithuania set a new record for simultaneous dribbling, previously held by Poland. 60,000 Lithuanians from Vilnius, Kaunas, Panevėžys, Klaipėda, Šiauliai and Alytus dribbled Molten balls simultaneously, beating Poland's record of 30,000 people.
 The Vilnius TV Tower observation deck was turned into a large basketball basket. It was made of lights that shone in the dark. The "basket" was 160 meters tall, higher than any other building in Lithuania.
 Composer Vidmantas Bartulis and poet Gintaras Patackas wrote an oratorio for basketball called "That Space-like Feeling of Basketball" ("Tas kosminis krepšinio jausmas"). This oratorio, praising basketball and Kauno Žalgiris team, was performed during the opening of Kaunas Arena on 16 August 2011.

Additionally, from Spring 2011, many of the TV and newspaper advertisements became basketball-oriented. Each of the cities where EuroBasket 2011 would take place received many minor details marking the championship: for example, the trash bins in Panevėžys were repainted to look like basketballs, an abandoned building in Vilnius had its windows covered by flags of the participant nations while balls were drawn on the pavement in some places.

Many ordinary Lithuanians decorated their cars with small Lithuanian flags flying above side windows (like during every other basketball championship). Flags covering the opposite side of the car mirrors are also popular. Some foreign fans who visited Lithuania during the championship adopted this practice as well.

A major Lithuanian news company adopted the practice of predicting each Lithuania national basketball team match in the EuroBasket. Lazdeika the Crab served as the oracle. The crab selected one of the two coconut shells to hide in when light was shone on it. Each of the two coconut shells has a country's flag – Lithuania's flag and opponent flag. At the beginning the crab's guesses would prove to be correct yet in the end they went wrong. Some people believe that the predictions were fixed - that is, the crab would be filmed many times and only when its "prediction" would match that of bookmakers would the "prediction" be aired on TV.

FIBA broadcasting rights 

At least some matches were broadcast in 150 countries and territories all over the world.

Financial details 

According to the Lithuanian Basketball Association the championship expenses were 32 million Litas and the income was 34.8 million Litas, which means the profit of the event was 2.8 million Litas.

Out of the 32 million Litas expenses some 9.8 million were funded by the Lithuanian state institutions whereas the remaining 22.2 million were amassed from sponsors or other sources. It is assumed that the state earned 11.9 million Litas due to VAT taxes paid by 20 000 foreign visitors therefore earning a 2.1 million Litas profit.

Out of the 34.8 million litas income 24.7 million Litas were amassed by selling tickets (TV rights and certain other rights are owned by FIBA rather than the local basketball association and therefore are not included in the revenues).

During the championship there were 3,984 people responsible for safety and 1,500 volunteers responsible for various duties such as helping spectators or giving the balls for play. The 1,500 volunteers were chosen out of 6,000 persons who wanted to volunteer.

1,300 journalists worked in the championships, out of them 200 were TV and radio commentators. 1,300 media accreditation licenses were issued.

Preliminary round 

Teams played each other once. The top three placed teams move on to the next round. In the event of a tie on points, direct matches between (points and goal average, i.e. points for/points against) were taken into account, if still tied, goal average in all matches was used as tiebreaker and not points difference.

All times are local (UTC+3)

Group A 
Venue: Cido Arena, Panevėžys

Group B 
Venue: Šiauliai Arena, Šiauliai

Group C 
Venue: Alytus Arena, Alytus

Group D 
Venue: Klaipėda Arena, Klaipėda

Second round

Group E 

The group composed of the three best ranked teams from Groups A and B. Teams coming from the same initial group didn't play again vs. each other, but "carried" the results of the matches played between them for the first round.

Four teams with the best records advanced to the quarter finals.

Group F 

The group composed of the three best ranked teams from groups C and D. Teams coming from the same initial group didn't play again vs. each other, but "carried" the results of the matches played between them for the first round.

The four teams with the best records advanced to the quarter finals.

Knockout stage 

 All matches were played in: Žalgiris Arena, Kaunas

 5th place bracket

Quarterfinals

Classification 5–8

Semifinals

Seventh place game

Fifth place game

Third place game

Final

Final standings 

The results of the championship included some surprises. Finland and Georgia, the latter supported by some 1,500 fans who had traveled to Lithuania, managed to reach the second stage despite being allowed to take part in the championship only after FIBA Europe decision. In fact Finland had the possibility of advancing to the quarterfinals until the very last game against Slovenia.

Croatia on the other hand was a powerful team that failed to reach even the second stage. Turkey with 5 NBA players failed to reach the quarterfinals.

The biggest surprise was probably Macedonia, a country that had had no major basketball victories prior to this championship. Having lost only two games in the first and second stages and these two by just a single point each (one of them after overtime) Macedonia easily advanced to the quarterfinals. In the quarterfinals the Macedonians defeated the hosts Lithuanians, and went to the semifinals.

A match between Georgia and Russia in Klaipėda was regarded to have political significance due to these countries having recently fought a war (the South Ossetia War). There were more than 1,000 Georgians and under 1,000 Russians in the arena during the game and large police forces were amassed to prevent possible riots. Despite the tight battle the Russians defeated the Georgians and prevented any surprise result. No riots happened.

These are the final standings. Two countries, Spain and France, qualified for the 2012 Summer Olympics basketball tournament outright.  Four more qualified for the 2012 Olympic Qualifying Tournament, with Russia and Lithuania obtaining qualification through the tournament.  In addition, Great Britain qualified as host.

Statistical leaders

Individual Tournament Highs 

Points

Rebounds

Assists

Steals

Blocks

Minutes

Individual Game Highs

Team Tournament Highs 

Offensive PPG

Defensive PPG

Rebounds

Assists

Steals

Blocks

2-point field goal percentage

3-point field goal percentage

Free throw percentage

Team Game highs

All-Tournament Team 

The following players were named to the All-Tournament Team:

PG –  Tony Parker

SG –  Bo McCalebb

SF –  Juan Carlos Navarro (MVP)

PF –  Andrei Kirilenko

C –  Pau Gasol

References

External links 

 Official website on FIBAEurope.com

 
2011
EuroBasket
EuroBasket
International basketball competitions hosted by Lithuania
August 2011 sports events in Europe
September 2011 sports events in Europe
Sports competitions in Vilnius
Sports competitions in Kaunas
Sports competitions in Klaipėda
Sports competitions in Panevėžys
21st century in Vilnius
21st century in Kaunas
21st century in Panevėžys
Sport in Šiauliai
Sport in Alytus